Kentau City Administration is an administrative body in the Turkestan region of Kazakhstan. The administrative center of this body is situated in the city of Kentau. On July 27, 2018, the body had incorporated twelve more districts to its jurisdiction which are - Babaykurhanskyy, Zhibekzholynskyy, Zhuynetskyy, Iaskyy, Karashytskyy, Novoikanskyy, Sauranskyy, Staroikanskyy, Uranhayskyy, Ushkayitskyy, Chahynskyy and Chernatskyy. The total geographical area signifying the jurisdiction of the body is  7,217.45 square kilometers.

District wise population

References 

Cities and towns in Kazakhstan
Populated places in Turkistan Region